Saba Sadiq (born 7 January 1966) is a Pakistani politician  who is a Member of the Provincial Assembly of the Punjab, from 2002 to 2023, and former minister.

Early life and education
She was born on 7 January 1966 in Lahore.

She earned the degree of Bachelor of Laws in 1991 and received the degree of Master of Arts in Political Science  in 2001, both from University of the Punjab.

She also holds the degree of Bachelor of Arts.

Political career

She was elected to the Provincial Assembly of the Punjab as a candidate of Pakistan Muslim League (Q) (PML-Q) on a reserved seat for women in 2002 Pakistani general election.

She was re-elected to the Provincial Assembly of the Punjab  as a candidate of PML-Q on a reserved seat for women in 2008 Pakistani general election. She joined Pakistan Muslim League (N) (PML-N) shortly afterwards.

She was re-elected to the Provincial Assembly of the Punjab as a candidate of PML-N on a reserved seat for women in 2013 Pakistani general election.

She was re-elected to the Provincial Assembly of the Punjab as a candidate of PML-N on a reserved seat for women in 2018 Pakistani general election.

References

Living people
Women members of the Provincial Assembly of the Punjab
Punjab MPAs 2013–2018
1966 births
Pakistan Muslim League (N) MPAs (Punjab)
Punjab MPAs 2002–2007
Punjab MPAs 2008–2013
21st-century Pakistani women politicians